Tom Annan Furniss (born 1988) is a New Zealand comedian.

Life and career
Tom grew up in Mount Maunganui. He studied Screen and Media Studies at The University of Waikato. In early 2010 he was selected as a finalist in Raw Comedy Quest. In the 2011 New Zealand International Comedy Festival Tom performed alongside John Carr in their debut show ‘Cold Duck and Tamogotchis’.
In 2011 his team Grand Cheval Productions won the 48HOURS Filmmaking Competition with their mockumentary about chumping; guys who jump over children. Tom is currently preparing for the Christchurch Classic body building competition which is an annual event for up and coming athletes.

References

External links 
 

1988 births
Living people
People from Mount Maunganui
New Zealand male comedians
New Zealand screenwriters
Male screenwriters
University of Waikato alumni